George Gessert is one of the best-known artists in the contemporary art movement known as bio-art a/k/a BioArt. Gessert began his career as a painter and printmaker, and began breeding plants as an art form in the late 1970s. Beginning in the 1980s, Gessert's work focused on the overlap between art and genetics, and he has exhibited a series of installations of hybrids and documentation of breeding projects.

Early life

George Gessert was born in 1944 in Milwaukee, Wisconsin. He has a BA in English from the University of California at Berkeley 1966 and an MA in Fine Arts from the University of Wisconsin-Madison in 1969.

Technique

Gessert creates his artistic irises by hybridizing wild varieties and discarding undesirable results. He is especially interested in plant aesthetics and ways that human aesthetic preferences affect evolution.  Gessert calls his practice "genetic folk art," and his work points to the way nature is interpreted—even authored—by humans.  Gessert's work mainly focuses on irises and other ornamental flowers.

Awards

Gessert's awards include the Leonardo Award for Excellence and the Pushcart prize for his essay, "Notes on Uranium Weapons and Kitsch." His article, "An Orgy of Power" was included in Best American Essays 2007.  Gessert is also an Editorial Board Member of Leonardo Journal published by MIT Press for Leonardo/ISAST, the International Society for the Arts, Sciences and Technology.

See also
 Leonardo/The International Society for the Arts, Sciences and Technology
 Art and Genetics Bibliography compiled by George Gessert for Leonardo/ISAST
 Art + Bio Gallery curated by George Gessert for Leonardo/ISAST

Citations

American artists
American male writers
Living people
BioArtists
Year of birth missing (living people)